The Goat, The Sofa And Mr. Swami is a book written by R. Chandrasekar about a Pakistani Prime Minister visiting India for a Test Cricket match and the ensuing diplomatic drama and chaos.

The plot
The Pakistani Premier's sudden decision to invite himself to a cricket series to be played in India creates uncertainty, panic and bureaucratic gamesmanship in New Delhi. Seemingly above such mundane concerns, India's elderly Prime Minister, devoted to movies, scotch, and late mornings, adds to the confusion with random utterances and occasional temper tantrums. His official factotum, a bureaucrat named Swami, plays the confusion for all it is worth, attempting to advance his career and settle old scores. Old rivalries between the Foreign Service and the domestic bureaucrats flare up as the day of the Pakistani Premier's visit approaches. Matters get stalled as rival departments choose to hide behind arcane laws. Conscious of his place in history and of the damage a botched visit would cause, the Prime Minister stages his own protests. Swami is forced to chart a treacherous course between his political and bureaucratic masters... A parable rooted in the absurdities of modern India, this novel takes a light-hearted dig at the pretensions of people who matter.

About the author
R. Chandrasekar was born in Madras and studied at Mayo College, Vivekananda College Madras, the Delhi School of Economics and the University of Chicago. He has researched and priced commodities and derivatives, traded bonds, managed portfolios, taught, and run a financial research centre. Chandrasekar lives with his family in the city formerly known as Madras. This is his first novel.

Other books by R. Chandrasekar
 The School of Core Incompetence (Hachette India, 2012)

References 

2010 novels
Novels set in Delhi
Novels about cricket